Jan-Vincent Velazco is a Filipino-born British drummer, session rock musician and composer.
He is a current member of Pendragon after the recommendation of Craig Blundell, drummer for Steven Wilson and Frost*. He also plays with Raymond Watts of KMFDM, Ben Christo of The Sisters of Mercy (Diamond Black and Night by Night)
and previously with Control.

Early life 
Velazco started playing drums at the age of 13. He was a self-taught drummer at first then later studied at Yamaha Music Foundation whilst playing in several bands until college. In 2012, he moved to Guildford, UK to study at the Academy of Contemporary Music and graduated with a Higher Diploma in Contemporary Music Performance before moving to London a year later.

Pendragon 
In July 2015, Pendragon were scheduled to perform at Night of the Prog in Germany and Ramblin' Man Fair United Kingdom together with acts like Neal Morse and Scorpions but due to commitments for the Steven Wilson tour, Craig Blundell was unable to appear with the band so recommended Vincent to stand in for him for these 2 shows.

Later that year, both Pendragon and Craig decided that Velazco would become the new permanent drummer for the band and in 2016 they announced a string of European headline shows in Germany, France, Netherlands, Switzerland, Italy, Austria, Poland, Belgium and the UK with support from John Young of Lifesigns/Bonnie Tyler.

They also recorded their live DVD from Katowice, Poland and an interview from Metal Mind Productions.

Whilst in Pendragon, Velazco has played alongside Dream Theater, Marillion, Scorpions, Pain of Salvation, Steve Hackett, Blue Öyster Cult, Saxon, FM, Anathema, Gregg Allman and Camel and has also toured Europe, Japan and North America.

In 2018, Velazco recorded the albums Men Who Climb Mountains and The World as part of Pendragon's fortieth anniversary booklet which included a live CD from their sold out European tour. 

In 2019 Pendragon went back to the studio and recorded “Love Over Fear” which is the band’s most recent album. It became Amazon’s best selling album for a week, spent 3 months at the Official Progressive Charts and number 4 in the 2020 Prog Reader’s Poll.

Session and Other Works 
In 2018, Velazco went on tour with Industrial rock musician Raymond Watts (Pig) in the U.S. supporting Killing Joke as part of their fortieth anniversary world tour. They performed the newly released album "Risen" plus some classics like "Juke Joint Jezebel" which was KMFDM’s biggest hit and was featured on films Bad Boys, and Mortal Kombat (1995) soundtrack.

This was followed by a UK tour in 2020 supporting the Los Angeles-based band 3Teeth.

In April 2019, Velazco was invited by Chris Dale to perform a special show in Sarajevo, Bosnia, commemorating 25 years since Bruce Dickinson’s band, Skunkworks (featuring Dale on bass), had played there during the war (as documented in the award-winning movie "Scream for me Sarajevo"). The show was a sell-out success, filmed for national television and with Dickinson himself in attendance.

In 2020, Velazco collaborated with Gabriel Agudo and Steve Rothery of Marillion to record the full length album “New Life”.

In 2021, it was announced that Velazco recorded the drums for world renowned guitar virtuoso and former Ozzy Osbourne guitarist and Firewind founder, Gus G. The single, “Exosphere”, was released via AFM Records and also features Dennis Ward on bass.

Endorsements 
Velazco uses and officially endorses Tama Drums, Sabian, D’Addario (Evans Drumheads and Promark), Audix, Protection Racket and Drumtacs.

Discography

Pendragon 

Albums
Masquerade 20 Live (2017)
The First 40 Years (2019)
Love Over Fear (2020)

DVD's
Masquerade 20 Live DVD (2017)

Gus G 
Albums
Quantum Leap (2021)

Gypsy Pistoleros 
Albums
The Mescalito Vampires (2021)

Gabriel 
Albums
New Life (2020)

Esprit D'Air 
Singles
Glaciers (2021)

Lannon 
Singles
Heaven's Gate (2020)

Leo Carnicella 
EP
Until a New Dawn (2020)

Album
Super~Sargasso Sea (2022)

References

External links 
Official Jan-Vincent Velazco Website
Official Pendragon Website

British rock drummers
British session musicians
Pendragon (band) members
Living people
Year of birth missing (living people)